The 2013 Formula D season (officially titled Formula Drift Pro Championship) was the tenth  season of the Formula D series. The season began on April 12 at Long Beach and ended on October 12 at Irwindale Speedway. Michael Essa was crowned series champion, Lexus won the inaugural manufacturer’s championship and Hankook Tire won the tire championship.

Schedule

Results and standings

Championship standings
Event winners in bold.

Manufacturer Cup

Tire Cup

References

External links
 Official Formula D Website

Formula D seasons
Formula D